Andrey Andreevich Koreshkov (Russian: Андрей Андреевич Корешков, born August 23, 1990) is a Russian mixed martial artist who competes in the welterweight division of Bellator MMA. He is the former Bellator Welterweight World Champion. As of February 7, 2023, he is #7 in the Bellator Welterweight Rankings.

Mixed martial arts career

Early career
Koreshkov made his professional mixed martial arts (MMA) debut in October 2010. He initially competed exclusively in his native Russia and compiled an undefeated record of 8-0 (five technical knockouts, three submissions) with none of his fights going to a decision.

The MMA news site Bloody Elbow listed Koreshkov as the top welterweight prospect in their 2012 MMA scouting report.

Bellator MMA
In January 2012, it was announced that Koreshkov would make his United States debut for Bellator.
  
In his debut, Koreshkov faced Tiawan Howard on March 30, 2012 at Bellator LXIII.  He won via KO in the first round.

Andrey next faced Derrick Krantz on May 18, 2012 at Bellator LXIX.  He won the fight via TKO in the third round.

Bellator Season 7 Welterweight Tournament
Andrey then faced Jordan Smith on September 28, 2012 at Bellator LXXIV.  He defeated Smith after 3 rounds, earning Koreshkov won a unanimous decision victory.

In the semifinals of the tournament, Koreshkov won via Technical Knockout, defeating Marius Zaromskis in the first round.

Koreshkov faced Lyman Good in the final of the tournament and won via unanimous decision (29–28, 29–28, 29–28). By winning the tournament, Koreshkov also secured a title shot.

Koreshkov faced Ben Askren in a bout for the Bellator Welterweight Championship on July 31, 2013 at Bellator 97. He lost the fight via TKO in the fourth round.

Bellator Season 10 Welterweight Tournament
In March 2014, Koreshkov entered the Bellator season ten welterweight tournament.  He faced Nah-Shon Burrell in the quarterfinal match on March 14, 2014 at Bellator 112. He won the fight via TKO during the first minute of the first round.

Koreshkov was expected to face Sam Oropeza on May 2, 2014 in Welterweight tournament finals at Bellator 118.  Oropeza, however, was injured and replaced by Justin Baesman.  Koreshkov won via knockout due to a flying knee in the first round.

In the finals, Koreshkov met Adam McDonough at Bellator 122 on July 25, 2014. He won the fight via unanimous decision, securing his second tournament win and title shot.

Bellator Welterweight Champion
Koreshkov faced Douglas Lima for the Bellator Welterweight Championship at Bellator 140 on July 17, 2015. He won the fight by unanimous decision to become the new Bellator Welterweight Champion.

Koreshkov faced former UFC Lightweight Champion Benson Henderson on April 22, 2016 at the  Bellator 153. He dominated the fight, winning a unanimous decision and scoring his first title defense as the Bellator welterweight champion.

Koreshkov faced Douglas Lima in a rematch in the main event at Bellator 164 on November 10, 2016. He lost the fight by knockout in the third round.

Post-Championship reign
Koreshkov was scheduled to face Fernando Gonzalez on March 3, 2017 at Bellator 174. However, Koreshkov pulled out of the fight due to injury.

Koreshkov faced Chidi Njokuani at Bellator 182 on August 25, 2017. He won the fight in the first round via a combination of punches and elbows.

Koreshkov faced Vaso Bakočević at Bellator 203 on July 14, 2018. He won the fight via knockout due to a spinning back kick to Bakocevic's mid-section early in the first round.

Koreshkov faced Douglas Lima in a third match as part of the opening round of the Bellator Welterweight World Grand Prix on September 29, 2018 at Bellator 206.  He lost the fight via a rear-naked choke in the fifth round.

Koreshkov was expected to headline Bellator 219 against Lorenz Larkin on March 29, 2019. However, Larkin withdrew from the bout citing an injury and was replaced by Mike Jasper. Koreshkov won the fight via unanimous decision.

The bout with Larkin eventually took place at Bellator 229 on October 4, 2019. Koreshkov lost the back-and-forth fight via split decision.

AMC Fight Nights
While Bellator had no events booked for the beginning of 2021, Koreshkov faced Adriano Rodrigues at AMC Fight Nights: Sochi on February 23, 2021. He won the bout via a first round armbar submission.

Return to Bellator 
Koreshkov faced Sabah Homasi in his return to Bellator MMA on August 13, 2021 at Bellator 264. He won the bout in dominant fashion onroute to a unanimous decision victory.

Koreshkov was scheduled to face Rustam Khabilov on October 23, 2021 at Bellator 269. However the bout was scrapped after Khabilov came down with a sickness.

Koreshkov was scheduled to face Mukhamed Berkhamov on February 19, 2022 at Bellator 274. However, Berkhamov pulled out of the bout at the beginning of February and was replaced by Chance Rencountre. He won the bout via spinning back kick which broke 5 of his opponents ribs and punctured his lung, 38 seconds into the bout.

Making a quick turnaround, Koreshkov was scheduled to face Paul Daley on May 13, 2022 at Bellator 281. However, due to undisclosed reasons, Koreshkov pulled out of the bout and was replaced by Wendell Giácomo.

With his last bout being canceled, Koreshkov, while still under contract with Bellator, faced Leonardo Cavalheiro on June 18, 2022 at Shlemenko Fighting Championship 4. Koreshkov won the bout via ground and pound TKO in the second round.

Championships and accomplishments

Mixed martial arts
Bellator
Bellator Welterweight World Championship (One time; former)
One successful title defense 
Most bouts in Bellator Welterweight division history (19)
Most wins in Bellator Welterweight division history (15)
Tied (with Douglas Lima and Michael Page) for the most knockout wins in Bellator Welterweight division history (eight)
Bellator Season 7 Welterweight Tournament Winner
Bellator Season 10 Welterweight Tournament Winner

Pankration
SportAccord
2010 World Combat Games Pankration Gold Medalist
International Federation of Associated Wrestling Styles
2010 FILA Pankration World Championships Senior Gold Medalist.

Hand-to-hand combat
Russian Union of Martial Arts
Bronze Medalist in Russian Hand-to-hand combat Championships.

Mixed martial arts record

|-
|Win
|align=center|26–4
|Leonardo Cavalheiro
|TKO (punches)
|Shlemenko Fighting Championship 4
|
|align=center|2
|align=center|3:39
|Omsk, Russia
|
|-
|Win
|align=center|25–4
|Chance Rencountre
|TKO (spinning body kick and punches)
|Bellator 274
|
|align=center|1
|align=center|0:38
|Uncasville, Connecticut, United States
|
|-
|Win
|align=center|24–4
|Sabah Homasi
|Decision (unanimous)
|Bellator 264
|
|align=center|3
|align=center|5:00
|Uncasville, Connecticut, United States
|
|-
|Win
|align=center|23–4
|Adriano Rodrigues
|Submission (armbar)
|AMC Fight Nights: Sochi
|
|align=center| 1
|align=center| 4:38
|Sochi, Russia
|
|-
|Loss
|align=center|22–4
|Lorenz Larkin
|Decision (split)
|Bellator 229
|
|align=center| 3
|align=center| 5:00
|Temecula, California, United States
|
|-
|Win
|align=center|22–3
|Michael Jasper
|Decision (unanimous)
|Bellator 219
|
|align=center|3
|align=center|5:00
|Temecula, California, United States
|
|-
|Loss
|align=center|21–3
|Douglas Lima
|Technical Submission (rear-naked choke)
|Bellator 206
|
|align=center|5
|align=center|3:04
|San Jose, California, United States
|
|-
|Win
|align=center|21–2
|Vaso Bakočević
|KO (spinning back-kick)
|Bellator 203
|
|align=center|1
|align=center|1:06
|Rome, Italy
|
|-
|Win
|align=center|20–2
|Chidi Njokuani
|TKO (punches and elbows)
|Bellator 182
|
|align=center|1
|align=center|4:08
|Verona, New York, United States
|
|-
|Loss
|align=center|19–2
|Douglas Lima
|KO (punches)
|Bellator 164
|
|align=center|3
|align=center|1:21
|Tel Aviv, Israel
|
|-
|Win
|align=center|19–1
|Benson Henderson
|Decision (unanimous)
|Bellator 153	 
|	 
|align=center|5
|align=center|5:00
|Uncasville, Connecticut, United States
|
|-
|Win
|align=center|18–1
|Douglas Lima
|Decision (unanimous)
|Bellator 140
|
|align=center|5
|align=center|5:00
|Uncasville, Connecticut, United States
|
|-
|Win
|align=center|17–1
|Adam McDonough
|Decision (unanimous)
|Bellator 122
|
|align=center|3
|align=center|5:00
|Temecula, California, United States
|
|-
|-
|Win
|align=center|16–1
|Justin Baesman
|KO (flying knee)
|Bellator 118
|
|align=center|1
|align=center|1:41
|Atlantic City, New Jersey, United States
|
|-
|Win
|align=center|15–1
|Nah-Shon Burrell
|TKO (knee and punches)
|Bellator 112
|
|align=center|1
|align=center|0:41
|Hammond, Indiana, United States
|
|-
|Win
|align=center|14–1
|David Gomez
|Decision (unanimous)
|FEFoMP: Battle Empires 3
|
|align=center|3
|align=center|5:00
|Khabarovsk, Russia
|
|-
|Loss
|align=center|13–1
|Ben Askren
|TKO (punches)
|Bellator 97
|
|align=center|4
|align=center|2:58
|Rio Rancho, New Mexico, United States
|
|-
|Win
|align=center|13–0
|Lyman Good
|Decision (unanimous)
|Bellator 82
|
|align=center|3
|align=center|5:00
|Mt. Pleasant, Michigan, United States
|
|-
|Win
|align=center|12–0
|Marius Žaromskis
|KO (punches)
|Bellator 78
|
|align=center|1
|align=center|2:14
|Dayton, Ohio, United States
|
|-
|Win
|align=center|11–0
|Jordan Smith
|Decision (unanimous)
|Bellator 74
|
|align=center|3
|align=center|5:00
|Atlantic City, New Jersey, United States
|
|-
|Win
|align=center|10–0
|Derrick Krantz
|TKO (knee and punches)
|Bellator 69
|
|align=center|3
|align=center|0:51
|Lake Charles, Louisiana, United States
|
|-
|Win
|align=center|9–0
|Tiawan Howard
|KO (punches)
|Bellator 63
|
|align=center|1
|align=center|1:26
|Uncasville, Connecticut, United States
|
|-
|Win
|align=center|8–0
|Kyacey Uscola
|TKO (punches)
|FEFoMP: Battle of Empires
|
|align=center|1
|align=center|4:03
|Khabarovsk, Russia
|
|-
|Win
|align=center|7–0
|Tadas Aleksonis
|Submission (D'Arce choke)
|Union of Veterans of Sport: Russia vs. Europe
|
|align=center|2
|align=center|4:25
|Novosibirsk, Russia
|
|-
|Win
|align=center|6–0
|Todor Zhelezkov
|TKO (punches)
|FEFoMP: Open Championship of Vladivostok
|
|align=center|1
|align=center|3:46
|Vladivostok, Russia
|
|-
|Win
|align=center|5–0
|Eldad Levi
|TKO (punches)
|FEFoMP: Mayor's Cup 2011
|
|align=center|2
|align=center|3:47
|Khabarovsk, Russia
|
|-
|Win
|align=center|4–0
|Abdula Dadaev
|Submission (armbar)
|League S-70: Sambo 70 vs. Spain
|
|align=center|1
|align=center|1:28
|Moscow, Russia
|
|-
|Win
|align=center|3–0
|Eduardo Conceição
|KO (knee)
|Fight Festival 30
|
|align=center|1
|align=center|0:11
|Helsinki, Finland
|
|-
|Win
|align=center|2–0
|Anzor Kardanov
|KO (knee and punches)
|Union of Veterans of Sport: Cup of Friendship
|
|align=center|1
|align=center|2:03
|Novosibirsk, Russia
|
|-
|Win
|align=center|1–0
|Alexey Aranzaev
|Submission (armbar)
|FEFoMP: Open Championship of Vladivostok
|
|align=center|1
|align=center|1:00
|Vladivostok, Russia
|

See also 

 List of current Bellator MMA fighters
 List of male mixed martial artists

References

External links

1990 births
Living people
Russian male mixed martial artists
Welterweight mixed martial artists
Mixed martial artists utilizing ARB
Mixed martial artists utilizing pankration
Mixed martial artists utilizing freestyle wrestling
Russian expatriates in the United States
Sportspeople from Omsk
Bellator MMA champions